Community Rowing Inc. (CRI) is a non-profit rowing club located on the Charles River in the Brighton neighborhood of Boston.

See also
List of Charles River boathouses
Head of the Charles Regatta
Harry Parker (rower)
USRowing
National Paralympic Committee

External links
CRI Website
CRI Instagram
CRI Twitter

Rowing clubs in the United States
Clubs and societies in Massachusetts
Organizations based in Boston